Rönström is a Swedish surname. Notable people with the surname include:

Anna Rönström (1847–1920), Swedish educator
Gunnar Rönström (1884–1941), Swedish track and field athlete
Eva Rönström (1932–2021), Swedish gymnast

Swedish-language surnames